This is an incomplete list of every brand (also known as make or marque) of car ever produced which has an article on Wikipedia.  Names should not be added unless they already have an article. Some are from manufacturing companies that also use their company name as a brand name; others are from subsidiary companies or divisions, or are products of badge engineering.

Argentina

Active brands 
 Zanella (1948–present)

Former brands 
 Anasagasti (1911–1915)
 Andino (1967–1973)
 ASA (1961– 1969)
 Eniak (1983–1989)
 Hispano-Argentina (1925–1953)
 Industrias Aeronáuticas y Mecánicas del Estado (IAME, Mechanical Aircraft Industries of the State, 1951–1979), not to be confused with Italian American Motor Engineering
 Industrias Kaiser Argentina (IKA, 1956–1975), United Kingdom

Australia

Active brands 
 Bolwell (1979–present)
 Borland Racing Developments (1984–present)
 Bufori (1986–present)
 Bullet (1996–present)
 Devaux (2001–present)
 Elfin Cars (1958–present)
 Finch Restorations (1965–present)
 Jacer (1995–present)
 Joss Developments (2004–present)
 Minetti Sports Cars (2003–present)
 Nota (1955–present)
 PRB (1978–present)
 Puma Clubman (1998–present)
 Python (1981–present)
 Quantum (2015–present)
 Roaring Forties (1997–present)
 Spartan-V (2004–present)
 Stohr Cars (1991–present)

Former brands 
 Alpha Sports (1963–2005)
 Ascort (1958–1960)
 Austin (1954–1983)
 Australian Six (1919–1930)
 Australis (1897–1907)
 Birchfield (2003–2004)
 Blade (2008–2013)
 Borgward
 Buchanan
 Buckle (1955–1959)
 Bush Ranger (1977–2016)
 Caldwell Vale (1907–1913)
 Cheetah
 Chrysler (1957–1981) (continues as a brand applied to imported cars)
 Ford (1925–2016) (continues as a brand applied to imported cars)
 FPV (2002–2014)
 Giocattolo (1986–1989)
 Goggomobil (1958–1961)
 Hartnett (1949–1955)
 Holden (Manufactured 1948 to 2017, import only 2017 to 2020) 
 HSV (1987–2017)
 Honda (continues as a brand applied to imported cars)
 Ilinga (1974-1975)
 Kaditcha
 Leyland (1973–1982)
 Lloyd-Hartnett (1957–1962)
 Lonsdale (1982–1983) (Cars produced and exported by Mitsubishi Australia and sold in the UK by the Colt Car Company under the Lonsdale brand.)
 Mitsubishi (1980–2008) (The brand continued to be used in Australia for fully imported cars after 2008.)
 Morris (1947–1973)
 Nissan (1983–1992) (The brand continued to be used in Australia for fully imported cars after 1992.)
 Pellandini (1970–1978)
 Purvis Eureka (1974–1991)
 Shrike (1988–1989)
 Southern Cross (1931–1935)
 Statesman (1971–1984)
 Tarrant (1900–1907)
 Toyota, Australian production finished (1963–2017) (continues as a brand applied to imported cars)
 Volkswagen
 Zeta (1963–1965)

Austria

Active brands 
 Eurostar Automobilwerk
 KTM
 Magna Steyr
 ÖAF
 Puch 
 Steyr Motors GmbH
 Rosenbauer
 Tushek&Spigel Supercars

Former brands 
 Austro-Daimler (1889–1934)
 Austro-Tatra (1934–1948)
 Custoca (also known as Custoka) (1966–1988)
 Denzel (1948–1959)
 Felber Autoroller (1952–1953)
 Gräf & Stift (1902–2001)
 Grofri (1921–1931)
 Libelle (1952–1954)
 Lohner–Porsche (1900–1905)
 Möve 101
 Steyr automobile 
 Steyr-Daimler-Puch

Azerbaijan

Active brands 
 GA (1986–present)
 NAZ (2010–present)

Former brands 
 Aziz (2005–2010)

Belarus

Active Brands 
 BelGee (2011-present)

Former Brands 
 Ford Union (1997-2000)

Belgium

Active brands 
 Edran (1984–present)
 Gillet (1982–present)

Former brands 
 ADK (1930)
 Alatac (1913–1914)
 Apal (1998)
 Astra (1931)
 Auto-Mixte (1906–1912)
 De Wandre (1923)
 Delecroix (1899)
 Excelsior (1904–1932)
 Flaid (1921)
 Germain (1901)
 Imperia (1906–1948, 2009-2015)
 Jeecy-Vea (1926)
 Juwel (1928)
 Meeussen (1972)
 Miesse (1926)
 Minerva (1939)
 Pieper (1903)
 Pipe (1922)
 Ranger (General Motors brand) (1970–1978)
 Royal Star (1910)
 Springuel (1912)
 Vincke (1905)
 Vivinus (1912)

Brazil

Active brands 

 Agrale (1982–present)
 Chamonix (1987–present)
 TAC (2004–present)
 Volkswagen (1953–present)

Former brands 
 Dacon (1964-1996)
 Dardo (1981)
 Engesa (1963–1993)
 Fabral
 Farus
 FNM (1960–1963)
 Gurgel (1966–1995)
 Hofstetter turbo (1986–1989)
 Lobini (2002–2014)
 MP Lafer (1974–c.1990)
 Puma (1967–1997)
 Santa Matilde (1977–c.1997)
 Troller (1998–2021)
 Uirapuru (1966–1968)
 Willys

Bulgaria

Active brands 

 Litex Motors
 SIN Cars

Former brands 
 Bulgaralpine
 Bulgarrenault
 Moskvitch
 Pirin-Fiat
 Sofia

Canada

Active brands 

 Intermeccanica (1959–present)

Former brands 
 Acadian (1961–1971)
 Amherst (1912)
 Asüna (1992–1995)
 Beaumont
 Bricklin (1974–1975)
 Brock (1921)
 Brooks (1923–1926)
 Canadian (1921)
 Canadian Motor (1900–1902)
 Clinton (1911–1912)
 Colonial (1922)
 Dominion Motors Frontenac (1931–1933)
 Envoy
 Epic
 Frontenac (1959–1960)
 Gareau (1910)
 Gray-Dort (1915–1925)
 London Six (1922–1924)
 Manic GT (1969–1971)
 McLaughlin (1908–1922)
 Meteor (1949–1976)
 Monarch (1946–1961)
 Moose Jaw Standard (1916–1919)
 Queen (1901–1903)
 Studebaker (1963–1966)
 Tudhope (1906–1913)
 ZENN (2006–2010)

China

Active brands 
 BAIC Group
 Beijing Automobile Works (1958–present)
 Arcfox (2017–present)
 Changhe (1970–present)
 Foton (1996–present)
 BYD (2003–present)
 Denza (2010–present)
 Chang'an Motors (1990–present)
 Changan (since 1986)
 Hafei
 Chery (Qirui) (1997–present)
 Dongfeng (1969–present)
 Dongfeng Fengshen
 Venucia (2010–present)
 First Automobile Works (FAW) (1953–present)
 FAW Tianjin (Xiali) (1986–2020)
 Haima Automobile (2004–present)
 Hongqi (Red Flag) (1958–present)
 Huali
 Fudi (1996–present)
 Geely (Jili) (1998–present)
 Lynk & Co (2016–present)
 Zeekr (2021–present)
 Shanghai Maple Guorun Automobile (2003–present)
 Great Wall Motors (1984–present)
 Haval
 ORA (2018–present)
 GAC Group (1954–present)
 Changfeng Motor
 Everus (2010–present)
 Gonow
 Trumpchi
 Hawtai (Huatai)
 Huachen (Brilliance)
 Jinbei (1992–present)
 Hwanghai
 JAC Motors (1964–present)
 JAC
 Heyue
 Refine
 Jiangling (1993–present)
 JMC
 Yusheng
  (2005–present)
 Landwind
 Lifan (2005–present)
 Huayang
 Nio (2014–present)
 Qoros (2013–present)
 SAIC Motor
 Baojun (2010–present)
 Maxus
 MG Motor
 Yuejin (1995–present)
 Roewe (2006–present)
 Wuling (1958–present)
 Shaanxi Automobile Group
 Sichuan Tengzhong
 Soueast Motors / Dongnan
 Xinkai (1984–present)
 XPeng (2014–present)
 Yema Auto (1994–present)
 Yutong
 ZX Auto (1999–present)

Former brands 
 Dadi (1988-2012)
 Baolong (1998–2005)
 Polarsun Automobile (2004–2018)
 Senova (2012–2020)
 Shuanghuan (1998–2016)
 Youngman (2001–2019)
 Zotye (2005–2021)

Croatia

Active brands 

Đuro Đaković
 DOK-ING
 Rimac

Former brands 
 Tvornica Autobusa Zagreb

Czech Republic

Active brands 
 Avia (1919–present)
 Jawa (1929–present)
 Kaipan (1997–present)
 Karosa (1896–present (since 2007 IVECO Bus)
 MTX / Metalex (1969–present)
 MW Motors (2010–present)
 Praga (1907–present)
 Škoda (1895–present)
 Tatra (1850–present)

Former brands 

 Aero (1929–1947)
 Aspa (1924–25)
 Gatter (1926–37)
 LIAZ (1951–2002)
 Stelka (1920–1922)
 Velorex (1951–1971)
 Walter (1909–1954)
 Wikov (1922–35)
 Zbrojovka Brno (1923–36)

Denmark

Active brands 
 PVP Karting
 Zenvo Automotive (2004–present)

Former brands 
 Anglo-Dane (1902–1917)
 Brems (1900 and 1907)
 Dansk (1901–1907)
 Krampers (1890–1960)

Egypt

Active brands 

 Speranza (1998–present)

Former brands 
 Nasr (1960–2008)

Estonia 
 Nobe

Ethiopia 
 Holland Car (2005–2013)

Finland 
Elcat 
Electric Raceabout (prototype, not in production)
Korvensuu (1912–1913)
Sisu Auto
Toroidion (2015-  ,prototype, not yet in production)
Valmet Automotive
Vanaja (1943–1968)
Valtra

France

Active brands 

 Aixam
 Alpine
 Bolloré
 Bugatti
 Chatenet
 Citroën
 De la Chapelle
 DS
 Goupil
 Ligier
 Microcar
 Peugeot
 PGO
 Renault
 Venturi

Former brands 
 Amilcar (1921–1939)
 Ballot (1905–1932)
 Berliet (1899–1978)
 Chenard-Walcker (1899–1946)
 Darracq (1897–1902)
 DB (1938–1961)
 De Dion-Bouton (1883–1932)
 Delage (1906–1953)
 Delahaye (1894–1954)
 Facel Vega (1939–1964)
 Gobron-Brillié (1898–1930)
 Hotchkiss (1903–1955)
 Lorraine-Dietrich (1836-1945)
 Matra (1964–2003)
 Panhard (1887–2012)
 Panhard et Levassor (1887–1940)
 Rosengart (1927–1955)
 Salmson (1920–1957)
 Saviem (1955–1978)
 Simca (1934–1979)
 Talbot (1916–1959)
 Talbot-Lago (1935–1959)
 Tracta (1926–1934)
 VELAM (1955–1959)
 Vespa
 Voisin (1919–1939)

Germany

Active brands 

 9ff
 ABT Sportsline
 Audi (1909–present)
 Alpina
 Artega
 BMW (1926–present)
 BMW M
 CityEl
 Ford-Werke
 Gemballa (1985-2018)
 Isdera
 Lotec 
 Magirus
 MAN
 Maybach
 Mercedes-AMG (1967–present)
 Mercedes-Benz (1886–present)
 Opel (1899–present)
 Porsche (1929–present)
 Ruf (1979–present)
 Smart (1994–present)
 Volkswagen (1937–present)
 Wiesmann

Former brands 
 Amphicar (1960–1968)
 Apal
 Auto Union (1932–1969)
 Bitter
 DKW
 Gatter (1952-1958) (formerly Czechoslovakia 1926–1937)
 Glas (1883–1966)
 Goliath (1928–1961)
 Hansa (1905–1931)
 Heinkel (1956–1958)
 Horch (1904–1932)
 Lloyd (1908–1963)
 Maybach (1909–2013)
 Mercedes (1900–1926)
 Messerschmitt (1953–1964)
 NSU (1873–1969)
 Trabant (1957–1991)
 VW-Porsche (1969–1976)
 Wanderer (1911–1941)
 Wartburg (1898–1991)

Greece

Active brands 

 ELVO (1973–present)
 Kioleides (1968–present)
 Keraboss (2011-present)]
 Korres (2002–present)
 Namco (1973–present)
 Replicar Hellas (2007–present)

Former brands 
 Alta (1968–1978)
 Attica (1958–1972)
 Autokinitoviomihania Ellados (1975–1984)
 Automeccanica (1980–1995)
 Balkania (1975–1995)
 BET (1965–1975
 Biamax (1956–1986)
 C.AR (1970–1992)
 Candia (1965–1990)
 Diana (1976–1990)
 DIM (1977–1982)
 EBIAM (1979–1984)
 Enfield (1973–1976)
 Hercules (1980–1983)
 MAVA-Renault (1979–1985)
 MEBEA (1960–1983)
 Neorion (1974–1975)
 Pan-Car (1968–1994)
 Record (1957–1999)
 Saracakis (1962–present)
 Scavas (1973–1992)
 Styl Kar (1970)
 Tangalakis (1935–1939)
 Theologou (1915–1926)

India

Active brands 

 Tata Motors
 Mahindra & Mahindra
 Maruti Suzuki
 Force Motors

Former brands 
 Hindustan Motors (1963–2014)
 ICML (2012–2018)
 Maruti (1983–2007)
 Premier (1947–2016)
 Reva
 Sipani Motors (Sunrise Auto Industries) (1973–1995)
 Standard (1949–1988)

Indonesia

Current 
Esemka
Pindad

Defunct 
Timor

Iran 

 Bahman
 Diar
 Iran Khodro (1962–present)
 Khodro Kaveer
 Kish Khodro
 Morattab
 MVM
 Pars Khodro (1967–present)
 Paykan
 SAIPA (1966–present)
 Shahab Khodro
 Zagross Khodro

Ireland

Active brands 
 Shamrock
 TMC Costin

Former brands 
 Alesbury (1907–1908)
 GAC Ireland (1980–1986)

Israel

Active brands 

 AIL
 Plasan

Former brands 
 Autocars
 Kaiser-Ilin Industries

Italy

Active brands 
 Abarth (1949–present)
 Alfa Romeo (1910–present)
 Casalini (1939–present)
 Cizeta (1988-2003)
 De Tomaso (1964–present)
 DR (2007–present)
 Ferrari (1947–present)
 Fiat (1899–present)
 F&M (2002-2009)
 Giannini
 Giottiline
 Grecav (1964-2012)
 Italdesign (1968–present)
 Iveco (1975–present)
 Lamborghini (1952–present)
 Lancia (1906–present)
 Maserati (1926–present)
 Mazzanti (2010–present)
 Pagani (1998–present)
 Piaggio (1943–present)
 Pininfarina
 Qvale (2000-2002)
 RUF (1979–present)
 Spada Vetture Sport (2007-2011)

Former brands 
 ASA (1961–1969)
 Autobianchi (1955–1995)
 Bertone (1982–1989)
 Bizzarrini (1964–1969)
 Cisitalia (1946–1963)
 Covini (1978-2016)
 Innocenti (1920–1996)
 Intermeccanica (moved to Canada)
 Iso (1953–1974)
 O.S.C.A. (1947–1967)
 Siata (1926–1970)

Ivory Coast 
 Baby-Brousse (1964–1979)

Japan

Active brands 
 Aspark (2017-present)
 Daihatsu (1951–present)
 Datsun (1931–present)
 Lexus (1989–present)
 Honda (1951–present)
 Acura (1986–present)
 Isuzu (1937–present)
 Mazda (1931–present)
 Mitsubishi (1917–present)
 Mitsuoka (1993–present)
 Nissan (1933–present)
 GT-R (2000–present)
 Nismo (1983–present)
 Infiniti (1989–present)
 Subaru (1953–present)
 Suzuki (1909–present)
 Toyota (1935–present)
 Yamaha Motor (1954–present)

Former brands 
 Autozam (1989–1998)
 Colt (1974–1984) (cars produced and exported by Mitsubishi Motors and imported into the UK by the Colt Car Company and marketed under the Colt brand)
 ɛ̃fini (1991–1997)
 Eunos (1989–1996)
 Hino (1961–1967)
 Prince (1952–1966)
 Scion (2003–2016)
 Toyopet

Kenya 
 Mobius (2013–present)
 Nyayo (1986–1999)

Liechtenstein 
 Orca

Malaysia 

 Bufori
 Proton
 Perodua
 TD2000
 Inokom
 Naza
 Hicom

Mexico 

 Dina
 Mastretta
 VAM

Namibia 
 Uri-Automobile (1995–2008 moved to South Africa)

Nepal 
 Hulas Motors

Netherlands

Active brands 

 Donkervoort
 Van Doorne's Automobiel Fabrieken
 Savage Rivale (2012–present)
 Spyker (1999–present)
 Vencer

Former brands 
 DAF
 Spyker (1899–1926)
 Eysink
 VDL Nedcar

New Zealand

Active brands in NZ 
 Almac (1985–present)
 Alternative Cars (1984–present)
 Chevron (1984–present)
 Fraser (1988–present)
 Hulme (2005–present)
 Leitch (1986–present)
 Saker (1989–present)

Former brands in NZ 
 Anziel (1967)
 Beattie (1997–2001) thence Redline
 Carlton (1922–1928)
 Cobra (1983–1990)
 Crowther (1968–1978)
 De Joux (1970)
 Dennison (1900–1905) – New Zealand's first indigenous car
 Everson (1935–1989)
 Heron (1964–1990)
 Marlborough (1912–1922) thence Carlton
 McRae (1990–2003)
 Mistral (1957–1960)
 Redline (2001–2009)
 Steel Brothers (1973–1981)
 Trekka (1966–1973)
 UltraCommuter (2006–2013)
 Wood (1901–1903)

Nigeria 
 Izuogu (1997–2006)
 Innoson Vehicle Manufacturing

North Korea 

 Pyeonghwa Motors
 Pyongsang Auto Works
 Sungri Motors

Norway 

 Kongsberg

Former brands 
 Bjering
 Buddy
 Geijer
 Norsk
 Think
 Troll

Pakistan

Active brands 
 Atlas Honda
 Honda Atlas Cars Pakistan
 FAW Pakistan
 Ghandhara Nissan
 Ghandhara Industries
 Heavy Industries Taxila
 Hinopak
 Master
 Millat Tractors
 Pak Suzuki
 Indus Motors Company
 Yamaha Motor Pakistan
 Sazgar
 Hyundai Nishat Motors
 Kia Lucky Motors
 United Auto Industries
 Prince DFSK
 MG JW Automobile

Former brands 
 Adam Motor Company (Defunct)
 Nexus Automotive (Defunct)
 Dewan Farooque Motors (Defunct)

Poland 

 Arrinera (2001-2015)
 FSO (1925-2002)
 Melex
 Polski Fiat (1932–1939, 1968–1992)

Portugal

Former brands 

 UMM (União Metalo-Mecânica) (1978–2001)
 Portaro (1975–1995)

Romania

Active brands 

 Dacia (1966–present)
 Ford Romania (2008–present)

Former brands 
 Oltcit (1976–1991)
 ARO (1957–2006)
 Daewoo Automobile S.A. (1991-2001)
 El Car

Russia

Active brands 

 Derways (2003–present)
 GAZ (1932–present)
 Lada (1966–present)
 UAZ (1941–present)
 ZiL (1916–present)

Former brands 
 Izh (1965–2008)
 Moskvitch (1929–2010)
 Russo-Balt (1894–1929/2006)
 KamAZ (1915-1997)
 Marussia (2007–2014)

Serbia

Active brands 
 FCA Srbija (2008–present)
 Zastava TERVO (2017–present)

Former brands 
 IDA-Opel (1977–1992)
 Yugo (1944–2008)
 Zastava (1953–2008)

Slovenia

Active brands 
 Revoz

Former brands 
 TAM (1947–2011)

South Africa

Active brands 

 Birkin (1982–present)
 Perana (2007–present)
 Puma (1973–1974, 1989–1991, 2006–present)
 Shaka (1995–present)
 Superformance (1996–present)
 Uri International Vehicle & Equipment Marketing (2008–present)

Former brands 
 Eagle
 GSM (1958–1964)
 Hayden Dart (1997–2003)
 Hi-Tech (1992–1996)
 Optimal Energy (2008–2012)
 Perana (1967–1996; a famous Ford manufacturer, today only active as a Ford dealer)
 Protea (1957–1958)
 Ranger (1968–1973)
 Sao (1985–1994)

South Korea

Active brands 

 Chevrolet Korea (2004–present)
 CT&T
 Galloper (1991-1998)
 Genesis (2007–present)
 Hyundai (1968–present)
 Kia (1962–present)
 Renault Samsung (1994–present)
 Ssangyong (1988–present)

Former brands 
 Asia (1965–1999)
 Daewoo (1983–2002)
 GMK (1972–1976)
 Saehan (1976–1983)
 Saenara (1962–1965)
 Proto (1997–2017)
 Shinjin (1965–1972)

Spain

Active brands 

 Aspid
 Comarth
 Cupra (1999–present)
 Gerard Farre
 GTA Motor
 Hurtan
 SEAT (1953–present)
 Spania GTA
 Tramontana (sports car)
 Tauro Sport Auto (2012–present)
 UROVESA

Former brands 
 Hispano Suiza (Planned Revival in 2019)
 Pegaso
 Santana

Sweden

Active brands 
 Volvo Cars (1927–present)
 Koenigsegg (1994–present)
 Polestar (1996–present)
 NEVS (2012–present) (bought by Saab)

Former brands 
 Rengsjöbilen (1914–1916)
 Saab (1945–2012)
 Hult Healey (1984–1990)
 Jösse Car (1994–1999)
 Tjorven (1968–1971)

Switzerland

Former brands 

 MBM (1960–1967)
 Monteverdi (1967–1984)
 Ranger (General Motors brand) (1970–1975)
 Rinspeed (1978–present)

Taiwan 

 CMC (1973–present)
 Formosa
 Luxgen
 Thunder Power
 Yue Long/Yulon/YLN (affiliated to Nissan)

Thailand 

 Thai Rung

Tunisia

Active brands 

 Industries Mécaniques Maghrébines (1982–1988, 1991–present)
 Wallyscar (2007–present)

Turkey 

 Anadol
 Devrim
 Diardi
 Etox
 Özaltin
 Tofaş (1968–date)
 TOGG

Uganda 
Kiira

Ukraine 
 ZAZ (1923–present)

United Arab Emirates 

 Devel Motors
 W Motors

United Kingdom

Active brands 
 AC Cars
 Arash
 Ariel (1991–present)
 Aston Martin (1913–present)
 Briggs Automotive Company (BAC)
 Bentley (1919–present)
 Bristol
 Caterham Cars (1957–present)
 David Brown (2013–present)
 Ford
 Ginetta (1958–present)
 Jaguar (1935–present)
 Jowett (1906–1954)
 Keating Supercars (2006–present)
 Lagonda
 Land Rover (1948–present)
 Lister
 London Electric Vehicle Company (LEVC) (2013–present)
 Lotus (1952–present)
 Mini
 McLaren (2010–present)
 Morgan (1910–present)
 Noble (1999–present)
 Radical (1997–present)
 Rolls-Royce (1904–present)
 Trident
 TVR (1946–2006,2013–present)
 Vauxhall (1903–present)

Former brands 
 AC
 Albion (1899-1972)
 Allard (1945–1957)
 Alvis
 Armstrong Siddeley
 Ascari (1995–2010) 
 Austin
 Austin-Healey (1952–1972)
 Berkeley (1956–1960)
 Bond
 Bristol (1945–2020)
 British Salmson (1934–1939)
 Buckler (1947–1962)
 Chambers Motors (1904–1929)
 Chrysler Europe (1976–1979)
 Clan (1971-1974)
 Crossley (1906–1958)
 Daimler
 Dellow (1949-1956)
 Durant (Produced the Star, 1922–1928)
 Dutton
 Elva
 Fairthorpe
 Farboud Limited (1999-2006)
 Frazer Nash (1925–1957)
 Gilbern (1959–1973)
 Gordon-Keeble
 Healey
 Hillman
 Humber
 Invacar
 Invicta
 Jensen
 Jowett (1906–1954)
 Lanchester
 Lea-Francis
 Lloyd (1936–1950)
 Lotus-Cortina
 Marauder (1950–1952)
 MG (1924–2011)
 Metropolitan (1953–1961)
 Midas
 Morris (1913–1984)
 Nash-Healey (1951–1954)
 Panther (1972–1990)
 Paramount (1950–1956)
 Peel Engineering Company (1955–1969)
 Peerless (1957–1960)
 Princess (1957–1960) (1975–1981)
 Reliant
 Riley (1907–1969)
 Rover (1904–2005)
 RW (1983–2000)
 Singer
 Spartan (1973-1995)
 Standard
 Sunbeam
 Sunbeam-Talbot
 Swallow (1954–1955)
 Talbot
 Tornado
 Triumph
 Trojan
 Turner
 Tyrrell
 Vanden Plas
 Warwick (1960–1962)
 Wolseley

United States

Active brands 
 AM General (1971–present)
 Anteros (2005–present)
 Arcimoto (2007–present)
 Aurica (2010–present)
 Bollinger Motors (2014–present)
 Bremach (2009–present)
 Buick (1903–present)
 Cadillac (1902–present)
 Chevrolet (1911–present)
 Chrysler (1925–present)
 Corvette (1953–present)
 Czinger (2019–present)
 Dodge (1900–present)
 Elio Motors (2009–present)
 Equus Automotive (2014–present)
 E-Z-GO (1954–present)
 Falcon (2009–present)
 Faraday (2014–present)
 Ford (1903–present)
 General Motors (1908–present)
 GMC (1913–present)
 Hummer (1992–2010, 2020–present)
 Hennessey (1991–present)
 Jeep (1941–present)
 Karma (2016–present)
 Lincoln (1917–present)
 Lucid (2014–present)
 Lyons (2011–present)
 Opel (1941–present) (from Germany)
 Panoz (1989–present)
 Polaris (1954–present)
 Racefab (1991–present)
 RAESR (2014–present)
 Ram Trucks (2010–present)
 Rezvani (2014–present)
 Rivian (2009–present)
 Rossion (2007–present)
 Saleen (1980–present)
 Scuderia Cameron Glickenhaus
 Shelby American (1962–present)
 SSC (1999–present)
 Tesla (2003–present)
 Trion Supercars (2012–present)
 Vehicle Production Group (2011-2013)
 Viper (1992–present)
 Zimmer (1978–1988, 1997–present)

Former brands 
 Ajax (1925-1926)
 AMC (1954–1987)
 American Simplex (1906–1910) (renamed to Amplex in 1910)
 Amplex (1910–1915) (previously known as American Simplex)
 Auburn
 Checker
 Coda (2009-2016)
 Cord
 Crosley
 DeLorean Motor Company (1981–1983)
 DeSoto (1928–1960)
 Detroit Electric (1907–1939)
 Devon (2008-2013)
 Duesenberg
 Eagle (1987–1998)
 Edsel (1958–1960)
 Frazer
 Fisker (2011–2014)
 Geo (General Motors brand) (1989–1997)
 Hudson (1909–1957)
 Hupmobile (1909–1939)
 Imperial (1955–1975, 1981–1983) (Chrysler Corporation brand – Imperial was also used as a Chrysler model name in certain other years)
 Jordan
 Kaiser
 LaFayette
 LaSalle (1927–1940)
 Local (2007—2022)
 Marmon (1851-1933)
 Marquette (General Motors brand)
 Maxwell
 Mercer (1909–1925)
 Mercury (1938–2011)
 Merkur (1985–1989)
 Moon
 Mosler (1993–2013)
 Nash
 Navistar International
 Oakland (1908–1931)
 Oldsmobile (1897–2004)
 Packard (1899–1958)
 Plymouth (1928–2001)
 Pontiac (1926–2010)
 Rambler (1897–1914 & 1958–1969)
 Saturn (1985–2010)
 Staver (1907–1914)
 Stearns-Knight
 Studebaker (1852–1967)
 Vector (1989-1993)
 Wheego (2009–2013)
 Willys (1908–1963)

Vietnam

Active brands 

 ChienThang
 THACO
 VinFast

Former brands 
 Vinaxuki (2004–2015)

See also
 Timeline of motor vehicle brands
 List of manufacturers by motor vehicle production
 List of automobile manufacturers

References

Citations

Bibliography

 
 Mazur, Eligiusz (Ed.). World of Cars 2006/2007: Worldwide Car Catalogue. Warsaw: Media Connection, 2006. ISSN 1734-2945
 

 
 
Car